The 2002 Chilean telethon (Spanish: Teletón 2002) was the 17th Telethon charity campaign held in Chile, which took place 29–30 November 2002. The theme was "The Telethon is Yours", (La Teletón es tuya) due to the complicated economic situation the country was experiencing that year, and to the lack of a Telethon in 2001 because of the parliamentary election.

The goal was to raise CL$10 billion. In 2001, the Telethon Foundation gave a press conference warning that they had to borrow one billion pesos to cover expenses for the subsequent months. Because of this, part of the official advertising featured the message "The Telethon is at zero pesos, help more than ever". The message also appeared on the official poster of the event featuring Don Francisco with a sad face showing the empty pockets of his trousers.

A final collection of CL$10,532,480,521 was reached, greatly exceeding the goal. The total was publicly given in the Chile's National Stadium on 1 December. The poster girl for the event was Kimberly Cruz.

Donation totals

First goal 
Don Francisco predicted that donations were going to exceed Telethon 2000 which collected $6,450,614,205. The last total announced in the theatre was $6,598,843,607, 148 million more than the previous season's goal.

Controversy

Threat of boycott 
One of the controversies was a threat of boycott by supporters of the Communist Party of Chile for alleged misuse of money donated. The party claimed that 25% of the collection was for entertainers and artists, and even said Don Francisco took 5% of donations. The charges were eventually dismissed. For her part, the party leader, Gladys Marin, told the press that the event should not be for entertainment but a task of state, also criticizing the donation of $40,000,000 that was to be given to the then Mayor of Santiago, Joaquin Lavín Infante.

Reviews of Los Prisioneros 
At the close of the Telethon at the National Stadium,  the group Los Prisioneros was introduced, who changed the lyrics of the song "Quieren Dinero" (They want money). In the new words, Jorge González Rios criticized both economic groups and various right-wing politicians in the chorus: "Quiero más Luksic, quiero más Angelini; quiero más UDI, quiero más Pinocheques; quiero más Büchi, quiero más Lavín; quiero más libras, quiero más dólares" (I want more Luksic, I want more Angelini, I want more UDI, I want more Pinocheques, I want more Büchi, I want more Lavín, I want more pounds, I want more dollars). The action was criticized by the organizers, decrying the use of the campaign for proselytizing, but it had the support of a significant number of Chileans who understood that the words of Gonzalez Ríos reflected the reality of the campaign:

On closing the event, the entertainer Kike Morande found the sayings of the group's vocalist a "very bad thing". Days later, at a conference, Gonzalez reaffirmed the statements he made in the last hours of the event. The Executive Director of the Telethon, Ximena Casarejos called the words of Gonzalez "like an attack", in an interview given to the Chilean newscast, 24 Horas.
Another version circulating about the reason for this criticism was a suspected "personal vengeance" by Jorge Gonzalez against the organizers of the Telethon, for the alleged censorship by TVN during the performance of its group in the 1985's Telethon, since Los Prisioneros was openly opposed to the then military regime of Augusto Pinochet.

Sponsors

Artists

National singers 
   Joe Vasconcellos
  Myriam Hernández
  Mala Junta
  Andrés De León
  Douglas
  Alberto Plaza
   Café con Leche
  Luis Jara
  Ciao
  DJ Méndez
  Los Jaivas
  Los Prisioneros
  Yerko Triviño
  La Ley
  Supernova
  Buddy Richard

International singers 
  Emmanuel
  Pedro Fernández
  Axé Bahía
  Víctor Manuel
  Yuri
  Porto Seguro
  Carambaxé
  Luis Fonsi
   Paolo Meneguzzi
  Patricia Manterola

Comedians 
 Sandy
 Daniel Vilches
 Bombo Fica
 Coco Legrand
 Álvaro Salas
 Dino Gordillo

Magazine 
 The Politicians danced axé
 Team Mekano
 Bafochi

Children's section 
 Cachureos
 Los Tachuelas
 Zoolo TV

Adult's section 
 Graciela Alfano

Transmission 
 Red Televisión
 UCV Televisión
 Televisión Nacional de Chile
 Mega
 Chilevisión
 Canal 13

References

External links 
 
 

Telethon
Chilean telethons